Batophila is a genus of beetles belonging to the family Chrysomelidae, containing some 30 species in the Palaearctic and Oriental regions.

Selected species
 Batophila aerata
 Batophila rubi
 Batophila rubiginosus

References

Alticini
Chrysomelidae genera